Action Réaction (Action Reaction) is a French Canadian game show, an adaptation of the American game show Chain Reaction, in which players compete to form chains composed of two-word phrases. It aired on TQS from 1986 to 1990, with Pierre Lalonde as host, and was taped on the same set as the then-concurrent Global/USA Network version.

Main game
Two teams comprising a celebrity and civilian faced a seven word chain. Each team member was given one responsibility. One teammate was the letter giver, and decided whether to give a letter to his or her partner or to other team's word guesser. A correct response was worth points and control of the board. In Round One, each word guessed was worth 10 points, but the final word guessed in that chain was worth 20 (changed to 15 in season two). In Round Two, these values escalated to 20 points each, and 40 points for the final word. Values for Round Three were again increased to 30 points each, and 60 for the final word. In the event that a fourth chain was needed to decide the game, the point values were 40 points per word and 80 for the final word. The goal was 200 points.

Bonus chain
The winning team could collect a cash jackpot by completing one last word chain. The team was shown the first word in a chain, and the initial letter of the other words. One at a time, the players would guess at the next word in the chain. For each wrong guess, the next letter would be filled in, and a letter deducted from their account which started at seven (nine at first). If the team could finish the chain before running out of letters the civilian won the cash jackpot. If not, he/she won $100 per correct answer.

Champions remained on the show until they were defeated or held their title for five consecutive days.

1980s Canadian game shows
1990s Canadian game shows
Noovo original programming
1986 Canadian television series debuts
1991 Canadian television series endings
Television series by Bob Stewart Productions
Television series by Sony Pictures Television
Television shows filmed in Montreal